The following is a list of novelizations based on Nickelodeon Original Series and Nickelodeon Original Movies.

Nickelodeon Original Series

CatDog

Chapter Books

Hey Arnold!

Chapter Books

iCarly

Series Novelizations